Merenciana "Ewon" Arayi (born November 5, 1985) is a Filipino former basketball player, who has served as the longest-tenured player and team captain of the Philippines women's national basketball team (Perlas Pilipinas, formerly Discovery Perlas) since the SEABA Championships in 2007. She is also the founder and president of the pioneering women's basketball league in the Philippines, the Pinay Ballers League and a member of Athletes in Action Christian ministry.

Playing career
Arayi was five months old when her father Gabriel, a criminology graduate went to Lagos to become a policeman. He returned to the Philippines when she was 16 years old.

Fresh from high school from Bolinao, Arayi's father brought her to Manila in 2001 to try-out with the Adamson Falcons women's basketball team led by coach Emelia Vega, who been stayed as a player and one of the team's constant performers in the UAAP during her collegiate career.

After her collegiate stint, she worked in a call center company. In 2007, Coach Haydee Ong of the Perlas Pilipinas national team recruited Arayi to join the national team. From then on, she was a many-time national team member of Perlas Pilipinas, having represented the country in different international competitions such as the Southeast Asian Games and the SEABA Championship, the latest of which is the 2015 FIBA Asia Women's Championship, when the Philippines received Level II ranking in the 2017 FIBA Asia Championship for Women. She was set to enlist as a member of the Philippine Navy.

In 2015, Arayi announced that she would retire after the 2015 Southeast Asian Games, where the Philippine team ended at 4th place, but didn't push through after her stint as the Point Guard of the team in the FIBA Asia Women's Championship.

She is also conducted basketball clinics in the far-flung provinces.

Pinay Ballers League
In 2014, she formed the Pinay Ballers League (PiBa League), a women's basketball league that aiming to have contributions to the national team. Her experience playing internationally was one of the reasons why she formed the league. The league is an avenue for former collegiate players and members of the national team to play in the professional ranks and to continue playing the sport.

References

1985 births
Living people
Filipino women's basketball players
Basketball players from Pangasinan
Adamson Lady Falcons basketball players
Philippines women's national basketball team players
Southeast Asian Games silver medalists for the Philippines
Southeast Asian Games medalists in basketball
Competitors at the 2015 Southeast Asian Games
Forwards (basketball)
Point guards